Hazelwood is a former incorporated town in Haywood County, North Carolina, that is currently a neighborhood of the town of Waynesville.

In July 1995 the two towns merged, due to the town of Hazelwood having financial issues.

Hazelwood still has its own post office, zip code 28738.

History
Hazelwood was incorporated in 1905 and was an industrial suburb of Waynesville. 

In 1982 a fire broke out at Benfield Industries, a bulk chemical mixing and packaging plant in Hazelwood and was referred to as "the day Hazelwood almost exploded".

References

Neighborhoods in North Carolina
Waynesville, North Carolina